Robert Membury was an English politician who was MP for Lyme Regis in 1386, February 1388, 1393, and 1394.

References

English MPs 1386
English MPs February 1388
English MPs 1393
English MPs 1394
Members of the Parliament of England (pre-1707) for Lyme Regis
14th-century births